"Stay" is the third single from Jay Sean's second album My Own Way & in the third album, All or Nothing. It was released on 7 July 2008 and became his lowest charting official UK single to date, peaking at #59.

History
The video was shot alongside the "Maybe" video.

A remix has been made with Boy Better Know members: Skepta, Jammer and Frisco, along with Chip

A Hindi version of the song was also included in the Indian release of the album My Own Way. It's also known as Tu Rahe

Formats and track listings

Music video
On 5 May 2008, the video was exclusively available to watch on YouTube. On 12 May 2008 the music video premiered on the music channel The Box. The music video for the song has an appearance from Thara, who worked with Jay on Murder and has done several shows with him.

The video for the Boy Better Know remix features the members Frisco, Skepta, Chipmunk and Jammer. The video also features MC Zani.

Charts

References

2008 songs
2008 singles
Jay Sean songs
Songs written by Jay Sean
2Point9 Records singles
Songs written by Alan Sampson